Pandit Krushna Chandra Kar (1 January 1907 – 2 November 1995) was an Indian poet and literary critic who has written both in the Odia and English.
He has authored books on Odia literature and inspired other writers like Bidyutprabha Devi and Chakhi Khuntia. He received a feliciation from the Odisha Sahitya Academy for his contribution to Odia literature in the year 1971 to 1972. He spent most of his life in Cuttack, Odisha.

Career
Pandit Krushna Chandra Kar wrote biographies, fictional works, and children's books both before and after Indian independence. He also authored an Odia to English dictionary called the "Taruna Sabdakosh" and an English to Odia dictionary called the "New Method English Dictionary", which has been in use at the Stanford University Libraries.

His better known Odia books include the "Ramayana" and "Shakuntala". He also authored collections of poetry, including "Rutu Samhara" and "Hansa Dutam".

He was arguably best known for children's literature and wrote "Pari Raija", "Kuhuka Raija", "Panchatantra", and "Adi Jugara Galpa Mala", among other works.
He wrote biographies of a number of historical personalities such as "Kapila Deva"

One of his famous English books was "The Maharaja : As I Knew Him".

Awards
He received the Odisha Sahitya Academy Feliciation, 1971-72

Books
KABYA
 Srivatsa
 Rutusanhara
 Khandadhara
 Hansaduta
 Pilanka rutusanhara

GATHA
 Gathayani

KABITA (POETRY)
 Kabita sanchayani

NIBANDHA
 Gadya sanchayani

NATAKA AND LOKANATYA (DRAMA)
 Karnajuna (bangala sanlapara anubada, gitamana ra anubadaka rachana)
 ABHIDHANA(DICTIONARY)
 New method English–Oriya dictionary
 Taruna sabdakosa

UCHANGA SAHITYA
 Bilwamangala
 Swadhinatara kahani
 Adijugara galpa
 Bagni biswanatha
 Swami bhairabananda
 Marusambhaba
 Utkal patana
 Hagila dinara smruti(atmacharita)
 Mari amara

KISHORA SAHITYA (ADULT’S LITERATURE)
 Mahabharata katha(part-1)
 Mahabharata katha(part-2)
 Upanishada katha(part-1) 
 Upanishada katha(part-2)
 Purana prabha (part-3)
 Purana prabha(part-4)
 Sadhana and sishi(part-1)
 Sadhana and sidhi(part-2)
 Sadhana and sidhi(part-3)
 Bana pahadara sathi
 Akasha rahasya
 Jataka kahani

SISU SAHITYA (CHILDREN'S LITERATURE)
 Laba kusa
 Parsuram
 Purana kahani(part-1)
 Purana kahani(part-2)
 Abhimanyu
 Janamejayav
 Rushi katha(part-1)
 Rushi katha(part-2)
 Sati
 Sunaraija
 Pakhiraja
 Asap katha
 Utkalara baraputra (part-1)
 Utkalara baraputra (part-2)

AMAR CHARITA
 Bhaktakabi madhusudana
 Kabibara radhanatha
 Samanta Chandra sekhara
 Sudhala deba
 Purushotam deba
 Mukunda deba
 Kulabrudha madhusudhana
 Utkalamani gopabandhu
 Karmabira gourishankar
 Sudramuni sarala
 Purana prabha(part-1)
 Purana prabha(part-2)
 Sejugara gapa(panchatantra)
 Sejugara chatra
 Panchatantra galpa(part-1)
 Panchatantra galpa(part-2)
 Panchatantra galpa(part-3)
 Bharata gouraba(part-1)
 Bharata gouraba(part-2)
 Nana desara upakatha(part-1)
 Nana desara upakatha(part-2)

SISU UPANYASA (CHILDREN'S NOVEL)
SERIES OF SUNARAIJA
 suna padua
 suna bauda
 suna chadhei
 suna panjuri
 suna baisi
 suna changudi

SERIES OF KUHUKA RAIJA
 kuhuka ghoda
 kuhuka kothi
 kuhuka janha
 kuhuka deepa
 kuhuka rani
 kuhuka mala

SERIES OF PARIMAHALA
 saraga pari
 golapi pari
 shagara pari
 jharana pari
 sapana pari
 jochana pari

SADHABA GHARA KATHA
 Sadhaba budha
 Sadhaba budhi
 Sadhaba pua
 Sadhaba jhia
 Sadhaba bohu
 Sadhaba nati

Bibliography
 Rämayana in Ordisi pata painting:-
 Taruṇa śabdakosha:- 
 Makers of Modern Orissa:-
 Hajilā dinara smr̥ti:- 
 Svāmī Bhairabānanda :- 
 New Method English to oriya dictionary

References

External links
 https://web.archive.org/web/20101218201619/http://www.orissasahityaakademi.org/english/common/sahitya-awards/award3.htm
 https://web.archive.org/web/20130311215021/http://orissadiary.com/CurrentNews.asp?id=21995
 Children's encyclopaedia 

1907 births
1995 deaths
Odia-language writers
Poets from Odisha
Indian literary critics
Indian male essayists
Indian children's writers
Indian male poets
20th-century Indian essayists
20th-century Indian poets
20th-century Indian male writers
Novelists from Odisha